KFMW (107.9 FM), known as "Rock 108", is a radio station based in Waterloo, Iowa. The station has an active rock format. Its signal is transmitted from the AFLAC Tower north of Rowley, Iowa.

History
KFMW came on the air in November 1968 as KWWL-FM and was originally owned by Black Hawk Broadcasting Company of Waterloo. It was one of two radio stations owned by Black Hawk Broadcasting's NBC affiliate, KWWL-TV, and for approximately 10 years, KWWL-FM/KFMW programmed an instrumental music format of what was called "beautiful music" by some and "elevator music" by most. The beautiful music format continues until May 1982 when it was flipped to a Top 40/CHR format under their new moniker "FM 108". It remained a CHR format until approximately 1992 when it was given its current name, "Rock 108." The station was essentially a classic rock station for a few years, morphed into an alternative rock format for a time in the mid-1990s, and eventually began an active rock stance in the late 1990s, which it remains today.

The station was sold by Black Hawk Broadcasting to Forward Broadcasting in the early 1980s, sold to Park Broadcasting in the late 1980s, to Bahakel Communications based in Charlotte, North Carolina, in 1996, to Woodward Communications of Dubuque, Iowa in 2012, and to NRG Radio, LLC in 2014.

KFMW is the #1 ranked rock station in eastern Iowa, serving the Waterloo/Cedar Falls metropolitan area as well as new owner NRG Radio's home base of Cedar Rapids.

External links
KFMW's official website

FMW
Waterloo, Iowa
NRG Media radio stations